Mulabagilu is a town and taluk headquarters of Mulabagilu taluk in the Kolar district in the state of Karnataka, India. It lies just off the National Highway 75 as the easternmost town of the state and a hill landmark.

Etymology
"Mulabagilu" (ಮುಳಬಾಗಿಲು) comes from the word mudalabagilu, which means the "eastern door" in the native Kannada language. Mulabagilu was supposedly the easternmost frontier of (and thereby the entrance to) the state of Mysuru.

History
One legend describes how the Hanuman temple here was installed by Arjuna, one of the Pandavas, after the Mahabharata war. Sage Vasishta is believed to have installed the idols of the main deity Srinivasa, Padmavati and Rama-Sita-Lakshmana.

The history of Mulabagilu was compiled by Benjamin Lewis Rice, in his book "The Gazetteer of Mysore" (1887).

In modern history, Mulabagilu is mentioned as the site of the Battle of Mulabagilu on 4 October 1768, during the First Anglo-Mysore War.

Geography
It has an average elevation of 827 metres (2,713 feet).

Economy
The major sources of employment are in the agriculture, dairy, sericulture, floriculture and tourism-related industries. Farmers in Mulabagilu are completely dependent upon borewell water for irrigation and drinking.
Mulabagilu is home to several famous temples, and is popularly known as the land of "Temple Places." Many transport and travel businesses set up their base here. Mulabagilu has many sericuluture and vegetable trading markets, including potatoes, tomatoes (in Vadahalli), brinjal, beans, beetroot, carrots, chow-chow and cabbage. The state government of Karnataka acquired non-agriculture land for industrial development activities as part of an initial step the government proposed for a granite industries hub at Mulabagilu Taluk. Mulabagilu is known for tobacco beedis. Many brands of beedis are produced and distributed to Karanataka and Andhra Pradesh. The Muslim community is largely engaged in this business.

Infrastructure
Mulabagilu is on NH-4, a newly-laid four-lane road from Bengaluru to Mulbagal-Nangali Karnataka border Kolar district, with a total length of around 110 km.  Approximately 354 km of major roads connect other locations to this area. 
Indian Railways connectivity: Now mulabagal is getting a railway line and station under the project of Kadapa - Bangalore (Till Kolar) new railway line.

A pool of human resources is available as many polytechnic, vocational training (ITI), teacher training intuitions, and graduation (science, agriculture, commerce and arts) colleges are located near Mulabagilu.  Many IT and technical people who work in Bengaluru travel daily from Mulabagilu to Bengaluru Adequate natural resources include granite and other types of rocks. The cost of living is less, and salary and wages are flexible.

Tourist attractions 

There are many hills for trekking.

Kshetra Palaka Sri Anjaneya Temple

Anjaneya Swamy Temple is located in Mulabagilu. Tired after epic war, Arjuna went on a pilgrimage and brought his flag used during war consisting of an image of Vayu Putra.  He established this temple in Mulabagilu, which was then called Shathaka Vatipuri.

Sripadarajamutt and Narasimha Thirtha

The Narasimha tirtha is about 2 km from the town of Mulabagilu towards the east on NH-4. It is the sacred place where Sri Sreepadaraaja Swamiji or simply Sripadaraja, a disciple of Saint Madhwacharya lived and had his vrindavan (sacred resting place for Hindu sages) made. It is now the headquarters of the Sripadarajamutt that he founded. There is a Swayamvyakta Yoga Narasimha temple near the vrindavan.

Someshwara Temple

Apart from the famous Hanuman Temple, this town has a Poorna Prasidda Someshwara Temple dedicated to Lord Shiva. The childless couples pray here for a child by making pradhakshinas.

Baba Hyder Vali of Mulabagilu

Mulabagilu is also sacred for Muslims as the dargah or mausoleum of Sufi Saint Baba Hyder Vali of Mulbagal. Baba Hyder Vali of Mulbagal or Syed Shah Baba Hyder Auliya Hussaini Suharwardi was a 12th-century Sufi saint of Suharwardi order. He was the disciple of Tabr-e-Aalam Baadshah Nathar Vali, of Tirchy.  Both Muslims and Hindus worship at the dargah. Urs of Baba Hyder-e-Safdar is celebrated every year on 11th of Rajab (according to the lunar calendar).

Virupakshi Swamy Temple

Sri Virupakshi Swamy Temple is in Virupakshi village about 4 km from Mulabagilu. This temple was built in the 13th century by Vijayanagara rulers and resembles the Virupaksheshwara Temple in Hampi. One family has been doing the pooja here since the temple was constructed and dates back about eight generations. The mythology tells that the Virupaskha linga was installed by great sage Atri Maharshi, father of Shriguru Dattatreya.
The linga changes its color in 3 ways from sunrise to sunset.

The temple complex also has goddess Bagulamukhi or Bagalamukhi devi temple. As per tantra, Bagulamukhi is one of the devis of Dashamahavidya. She is the keeper of Brahmaastra. She is considered to be one of the most powerful goddesses and its rare to find such temple. It is believed that King Vikramaaditya built the Bagulamukhi temple at Virupakshi.

Venugopala swamy temple, Gujjanahalli

Located 14 km far from mulabagal, it is on the way to Srinivasapura. There is an ancient temple of venugopala swamy''' built in Chola style temple. Pilgrims can visit this temple.Garuda Temple and Sri Prasanna Chowdeshwari Temple, KoladeviGaruda Temple is one of the ancient epic Ramayana-related temples located at Koladevi 18 km from Mulabagilu national highway, 19 km from Srinivaspur and 4 km from Mudianur.  It was built under the supervision of Sri Ramanujacharya, but only came to light recently. Sri Prasanna Chowdeshwari Temple is 300 years old.Kurudumale, Maha Ganapathi Temple and Someshwara TempleKurudumale, 8 km northwest from Mulabagilu, is famous for Lord Ganapati Temple. The idol of Ganapati is made of a single "Shaligram rock" and is about 21 feet from ground level. The idol and temple are estimated to be 5,000 years old.Sri Varadaraja Swamy Temple, UttanurThe great Saint Brugu Maharshi have built a Sri Varadaraja Swamy temple in Uttanur or Uthanur. The Uttanur is a called as a Uttama Kanchi. Every year in the day of Bharatha Hunime the Rathothsava will happening. It is importanat place for Saints for doing Japa Thapas. The
Gangas build the Sri Uttameshwara Temple in Uttanur.Chowdeswaramma Temple, MandikalMandikal Chowdeswaramma temple is at least 1000 years old and popular for miracles, situated at a distance of 8 miles. Recently this temple has been renovated by devotees of nearing villages like, Mandikal, Koladevi, Gollahalli Harapanakana halli.AvaniKnown as the Gaya of the south, Avani has a cluster of Ramalingeshwara temple all within one courtyard dedicated to Lakshmana, Bharata and Shatrugna as well as a Shankar Math built by the Nolamba dynasty. Legend has it, that the hill above was home to Valmiki's ashram, where Lava & Kusha were born and raised.
GUNIGANTIPALYA.
Ranaberamma temple gunugantipalya, Gangamma temple gunigantipalya circle. Koladevi Garuda Temple is one of the famous temple.Mulabagilu Dosa''

This wonderful place has an ample variety of foods, one of the best is Mulabagilu Masala Dosa. People from various places visit here to just have a taste of this wonderful recipe. This special Masala Dosa is made with full of love and ghee which will make us remember its taste for ever.

Demographics
 India census, Mulabagilu had a population of 44,031. Males constitute 51% of the population and females 49%. Mulabagilu has an average literacy rate of 61%, higher than the national average of 59.5%.  Male literacy is 67%, and female literacy is 54%. In Mulabagilu, 14% of the population is under 6 years of age.

Notable people
 D. V. Gundappa, popularly known as DVG, was a prominent Kannada writer and a philosopher.
 N. Venkatachala, is a retired judge of the Supreme court of India and former Lokayukta of the state of Karnataka. 
 Soundarya, a film actress and producer, was born in Ganjigunte village of Mulbagal taluk.

See also 
 Soorakunte, Uttanuru, Achampally, Byrakur, Nangali, Kurudumale, Dodda Athihalli located in Mulabagilu Taluk, Kolar District.
 Devarayasamudram, Avani, Kolar located in Mulabagilu Taluk, Kolar District.

References

External links

Cities and towns in Kolar district
Taluks of Karnataka